Kevin Alvin Willis (born September 6, 1962) is an American former professional basketball player mostly known for playing with the Atlanta Hawks in the National Basketball Association (NBA). He was a 7-foot power forward/center. Excluding players not yet eligible, he holds the record for most games played among those not in the Naismith Memorial Basketball Hall of Fame.

Willis is one of fifteen players in NBA history with over 16,000 career points and 11,000 career rebounds. He was named to the NBA Eastern Conference All-Star Team in 1992, when he finished the season with a career-high average of 15.5 rebounds a game. 
Willis holds career averages of 12.2 ppg, 8.4 rpg, and 0.9 apg while averaging 27 minutes per game in 21 NBA seasons. During his 23 years in the league, Willis won one championship, with the San Antonio Spurs in 2003. He shares the second position for most seasons played in the NBA with Robert Parish, Kevin Garnett, and Dirk Nowitzki.

During the 2004–05 season, Willis was the oldest player in the league at age 42, and he would continue to be until his retirement at the conclusion of the 2006–07 season at the age of 44.

High school and college
Born in Los Angeles, Willis graduated from Pershing High School in Detroit and joined the basketball team in his junior year. Willis played competitively at Jackson College for his freshman season and transferred to Michigan State University, where he would play three seasons as a fashion and textiles major.

Professional career

Atlanta Hawks
He was selected in the 1984 NBA draft by the Atlanta Hawks. He played with the Hawks for nine seasons (plus two games of a tenth season) until 1994. Willis teamed with Dominique Wilkins, Spud Webb, and Doc Rivers to frequently guide the Hawks to playoff appearances as well as providing a fierce rebounding presence in the post. Near the end of his stint with the Hawks, he and Wilkins were both made team captains.

Miami Heat
Willis was traded to the Miami Heat in 1994 for Grant Long and Steve Smith. The trade was so badly received in Miami that it indirectly led to the organization seeking to, and eventually succeeding in, hiring Pat Riley to be their new head coach and General Manager.

Golden State Warriors
On the 1996 NBA trade deadline, the Golden State Warriors acquired Willis, along with Bimbo Coles, in exchange for Chris Gatling and Tim Hardaway.

Houston Rockets
Willis signed with the Houston Rockets in 1996.

Toronto Raptors
On June 9, 1998, Willis was traded to the Toronto Raptors for Roy Rogers and two 1998 first-round picks.

Denver Nuggets, trade to Milwaukee, and return to Rockets
On January 12, 2001, the Denver Nuggets acquired Willis, Aleksandar Radojević, Garth Joseph, and a 2001 2nd-round pick in a deal that brought Tracy Murray, Keon Clark, and Mamadou N'Diaye to Toronto. He and Radojević were traded together nine months later to the Milwaukee Bucks for Scott Williams and a 2002 second-round pick. Without playing a game for the Bucks, Willis was traded back to the Rockets for another 2002 second-round pick.

San Antonio Spurs
Willis signed with the San Antonio Spurs. It was in 2003 with the Spurs that he finally won an NBA Championship ring.

Return to the Atlanta Hawks
Willis returned to the Hawks for one more season in 2004–05, and by doing so, positioned himself to be the oldest player in the league.

Dallas Mavericks
On March 30, 2007, The Dallas Morning News reported that Willis needed only to pass a physical to be able to sign with the Western Conference-leading Dallas Mavericks. Willis, who did not play in 2005–06, was reported to take the team's vacant 15th roster spot. The deal became official when he signed a 10-day contract with the Mavericks on April 2, 2007. He appeared in five late regular-season games and was on the Mavericks playoff roster as the 12th man but did not play in the Mavericks' shocking early first-round exit. By playing five games during 2006–07, Willis became the oldest person to play more than two games in an NBA season (Providence Steamrollers coach Nat Hickey activated himself for two games in 1948, at 45 years and 363 days old.) Hall of Famer Robert Parish, who – at age 43 – played 43 games with the Chicago Bulls in 1996–97, previously held many of Willis’ longevity and age-based records.

Retirement
Willis ended his playing career after the 2006–07 season, returning to his clothing business, Willis & Walker. The Atlanta-based company, which specializes in custom wear for big and tall men, was founded in 1988 by Willis and his former Michigan State teammate Ralph Walker.

Television appearances
In 2007, Willis made three appearances on the Spike TV reality show, Pros vs Joes.

NBA career statistics

Regular season

|-
| style="text-align:left;"| 
| style="text-align:left;"|Atlanta
| 82 || 19 || 21.8 || .467 || .221 || .657 || 6.4 || .4 || .4 || .6 || 9.3
|-
| style="text-align:left;"| 
| style="text-align:left;"|Atlanta
| 82 || 59 || 28.0 || .517 || .000 || .654 || 8.6 || .5 || .8 || .5 || 12.3
|-
| style="text-align:left;"| 
| style="text-align:left;"|Atlanta
| 81 || 81 || 32.4 || .536 || .250 || .709 || 10.5 || .8 || .8 || .8 || 16.1
|-
| style="text-align:left;"| 
| style="text-align:left;"|Atlanta
| 75 || 55 || 27.9 || .518 || .000 || .649 || 7.3 || .4 || .9 || .5 || 11.6
|-
| style="text-align:left;"| 
| style="text-align:left;"|Atlanta
| 81 || 51 || 28.1 || .519 || .286 || .683 || 8.0 || .7 || .8 || .6 || 12.4
|-
| style="text-align:left;"| 
| style="text-align:left;"|Atlanta
| 80 || 80 || 29.7 || .504 || .400 || .668 || 8.8 || 1.2 || .8 || .5 || 13.1
|-
| style="text-align:left;"| 
| style="text-align:left;"|Atlanta
| 81 || 80 || 36.6 || .483 || .162 || .804 || 15.5 || 2.1 || .9 || .7 || 18.3
|-
| style="text-align:left;"| 
| style="text-align:left;"|Atlanta
| 80 || 80 || 36.0 || .506 || .241 || .653 || 12.9 || 2.1 || .9 || .5 || 17.9
|-
| style="text-align:left;"| 
| style="text-align:left;"|Atlanta
| 80 || 80 || 35.8 || .499 || .375 || .713 || 12.0 || 1.9 || 1.0 || .5 || 19.1
|-
| style="text-align:left;"| 
| style="text-align:left;"|Atlanta
| 2 || 2 || 44.5 || .390 || .000 || .667 || 18.0 || 1.5 || .5 || 1.5 || 21.0
|-
| style="text-align:left;"|
| style="text-align:left;"| Miami
| 65 || 61 || 35.4 || .469 || .214 || .691 || 10.7 || 1.3 || .9 || .5 || 17.1
|-
| style="text-align:left;"| 
| style="text-align:left;"| Miami
| 47 || 42 || 28.9 || .473 || .000 || .712 || 8.9 || .7 || .4 || .5 || 10.2
|-
| style="text-align:left;"|
| style="text-align:left;"| Golden State
| 28 || 18 || 27.8 || .433 || .250 || .701 || 7.8 || .7 || .5 || .6 || 11.3
|-
| style="text-align:left;"| 
| style="text-align:left;"| Houston
| 75 || 32 || 26.2 || .481 || .143 || .693 || 7.5 || .9 || .6 || .4 || 11.2 
|-
| style="text-align:left;"| 
| style="text-align:left;"| Houston
| 81 || 74 || 31.2 || .510 || .143 || .793 || 8.4 || 1.0 || .7 || .5 || 16.1 
|-
| style="text-align:left;"| 
| style="text-align:left;"| Toronto
| 42 || 38 || 29.0 || .418 || .000 || .839 || 8.3 || 1.6 || .7 || .7 || 12.0
|-
| style="text-align:left;"| 
| style="text-align:left;"| Toronto
| 79 || 1 || 21.3 || .415 || .333 || .799 || 6.1 || .6 || .5 || .6 || 7.6
|-
| style="text-align:left;"| 
| style="text-align:left;"| Toronto
| 35 || 9 || 22.0 || .461 || .000 || .753 || 6.4 || .6 || .5 || .6 || 8.8
|-
| style="text-align:left;"| 
| style="text-align:left;"| Denver
| 43 || 13 || 24.6 || .428 || .250 || .788 || 7.2 || .7 || .9 || .7 || 9.6
|-
| style="text-align:left;"| 
| style="text-align:left;"| Houston
| 52 || 5 || 16.7 || .440 || .000 || .747 || 5.8 || .3 || .5 || .4 || 6.1
|-
| style="text-align:left;" bgcolor="AFE6BA"| †
| style="text-align:left;"| San Antonio
| 71 || 6 || 11.8 || .479 || .000 || .614 || 3.2 || .3 || .3 || .3 || 4.2
|-
| style="text-align:left;"| 
| style="text-align:left;"| San Antonio
| 48 || 0 || 7.8 || .467 || .000 || .615 || 2.0 || .2 || .4 || .2 || 3.4
|-
| style="text-align:left;"| 
| style="text-align:left;"| Atlanta
| 29 || 5 || 11.9 || .389 || .000 || .739 || 2.6 || .3 || .3 || .2 || 3.0
|-
| style="text-align:left;"| 
| style="text-align:left;"| Dallas
| 5 || 0 || 8.6 || .385 || – || 1.000 || 1.6 || .2 || .4 || .2 || 2.4
|- class="sortbottom"
| style="text-align:center;" colspan="2"| Career
| 1,424 || 891 || 26.9 || .487 || .211 || .713 || 8.4 || .9 || .7 || .5 || 12.1
|- class="sortbottom"
| style="text-align:center;" colspan="2"| All-Star
| 1 || 0 || 14.0 || .400 || – || – || 4.0 || .0 || .0 || .0 || 8.0

Playoffs

|-
| style="text-align:left;"| 1986
| style="text-align:left;"| Atlanta
| 9 || – || 31.1 || .561 || – || .652 || 7.2 || .6 || .8 || .9 || 13.9
|-
| style="text-align:left;"| 1987
| style="text-align:left;"| Atlanta
| 9 || – || 39.6 || .522 || – || .677 || 9.2 || .7 || 1.0 || .8 || 15.7
|-
| style="text-align:left;"| 1988
| style="text-align:left;"| Atlanta
| 12 || – || 38.5 || .580 || .000 || .680 || 9.0 || .9 || .8 || .8 || 16.2
|-
| style="text-align:left;"| 1991
| style="text-align:left;"| Atlanta
| 5 || 5 || 31.8 || .403 || .667 || .700 || 9.0 || 1.0 || .4 || .2 || 15.4
|-
| style="text-align:left;"| 1993
| style="text-align:left;"| Atlanta
| 3 || 3 || 34.3 || .467 || .000 || .571 || 8.7 || 1.0 || .7 || .0 || 16.7
|-
| style="text-align:left;"| 1994
| style="text-align:left;"| Atlanta
| 11 || 11 || 32.9 || .457 || .000 || .762 || 10.8 || 1.0 || .7 || .5 || 12.2
|-
| style="text-align:left;"| 1997
| style="text-align:left;"| Houston
| 16 || 0 || 18.4 || .400 || .000 || .684 || 4.7 || .7 || .6 || .3 || 6.4
|-
| style="text-align:left;"| 1998
| style="text-align:left;"| Houston
| 5 || 5 || 33.6 || .400 || .000 || .750 || 10.6 || 1.0 || 1.0 || 1.6 || 11.2
|-
| style="text-align:left;"| 2000
| style="text-align:left;"| Toronto
| 3 || 0 || 25.3 || .364 || – || .750 || 8.7 || .3 || .7 || .0 || 13.0
|-
| style="text-align:left;" bgcolor="AFE6BA"| 2003†
| style="text-align:left;"| San Antonio
| 18 || 0 || 5.1 || .525 || 1.000 || 1.000 || 1.7 || .1 || .1 || .1 || 2.6
|-
| style="text-align:left;"| 2004
| style="text-align:left;"| San Antonio
| 7 || 0 || 3.6 || .375 || .000 || .000 || .9 || .0 || .1 || .0 || .9
|- class="sortbottom"
| style="text-align:center;" colspan="2"| Career
| 98 || – || 24.3 || .484 || .214 || .692 || 6.5 || .6 || .6 || .4 || 9.9

See also
 List of National Basketball Association career games played leaders
 List of National Basketball Association career minutes played leaders
 List of National Basketball Association career rebounding leaders
 List of National Basketball Association players with most rebounds in a game
 List of oldest and youngest National Basketball Association players
List of National Basketball Association seasons played leaders

References

External links
Kevin Willis biography at NBA.com (archived from 2004)

Hey! Whatever Happened To Kevin Willis?

1962 births
Living people
African-American basketball players
African-American fashion designers
American fashion designers
American expatriate basketball people in Canada
American men's basketball players
Atlanta Hawks draft picks
Atlanta Hawks players
Basketball players from Los Angeles
Centers (basketball)
Dallas Mavericks players
Denver Nuggets players
Golden State Warriors players
Houston Rockets players
Junior college men's basketball players in the United States
Miami Heat players
Michigan State Spartans men's basketball players
National Basketball Association All-Stars
Power forwards (basketball)
San Antonio Spurs players
Basketball players from Detroit
Toronto Raptors players
Pershing High School alumni
21st-century African-American people
20th-century African-American sportspeople